Kostadin Zahov (born 8 November 1987) is a Macedonian footballer who plays as a goalkeeper for Shkëndija and the Macedonia national team.

International career
Zahov made his debut for Macedonia on 5 September 2016 in a 2018 FIFA World Cup qualification match against Albania, which finished as a 1–2 away loss.

Career statistics

International

References

External links
 
 
 
 

1987 births
Living people
Sportspeople from Strumica
Association football goalkeepers
Macedonian footballers
North Macedonia international footballers
FK Belasica players
FK Vardar players
FK Horizont Turnovo players
FK Bregalnica Štip players
KF Shkëndija players
Macedonian First Football League players
Macedonian Second Football League players